All Clues Lead to Berlin is a 1952 West German thriller film directed by František Čáp and starring Gordon Howard, Irina Garden and Kurt Meisel. It is also known by the alternative titles Adventure in Berlin and International Counterfeiters.

It portrays a gang of counterfeiters with links to the former Nazi regime.

It was shot at the Spandau Studios and on location across Berlin including at the ruins of the Reichstag building. The film's sets were designed by the art directors Emil Hasler and Walter Kutz. It was given a British release in 1953.

Plot 
Berlin in the early 1950s. Two men take the elevator up the Berlin radio tower. A heated argument ensues between the two. One man asks the other, reluctantly, not to make any obstacles and to come with him. "She informed us," he says ambiguously. When the other refuses, the first pulls out a revolver. A scuffle ensues, then a shot is fired, which is drowned out by a plane flying over the top of the radio tower. The gunman flees back down with the elevator. Meanwhile, on the floor with the restaurant below, a young, elegant woman is waiting, drinking a coffee and reading the 'Stern'. The man who was shot also carried the 'star' with him, obviously a mark of identification. After the shooter, whom the woman with the 'star' on the elevator sees for a few seconds, has disappeared, she rushes up to the viewing platform and sees the fatally wounded man dying. Blood trickles from his chest. Another man with his wife and two young children have also arrived on the platform. The dying man tells the father of the family the beginning of his name, Dorn, only twice more... before he dies. When the elevator operator is informed of the murder, those present look down where the killer rushes across the street and sped off in a black limousine that was waiting for him.

The police start a large-scale manhunt and Berlin's cops attach themselves in their VW Beetles to the limousine driven by the crook Martin. When the gangsters are about to be caught, Martin dashes through the police blockade and escapes through the Brandenburg Gate to the east of the city. The two detectives Wengen and Lüdecke are busy with US dollar bills, which are flooding West Berlin in large numbers, when Lüdecke mentions the murder at the radio tower. Apparently the two cases are related. Meanwhile, an American flies into Tempelhof. It is the lawyer Ronald Roberts who is looking for a Karl Dornbrink. Since he cannot find him, he first looks up his daughter Vera Dornbrink, who works as a ballet teacher. She is the woman who was waiting for the later murdered man in the radio tower restaurant at the beginning of the film. Roberts explains to Vera that her father inherited a farm in Ohio and $150,000 from his stepbrother. Vera then explains to Roberts that her father is no longer alive and died in a labor camp in Austria shortly before the end of the war. Roberts quickly takes a liking to Vera and tries to get to know her better. Both are dating. Little does Roberts know that Vera knows a lot more than she lets on. In fact, her father, once a sought-after artist, is still alive.

Gregor Pratt, head of a counterfeiting ring, has been pressuring Vera to cooperate with him for some time. Pratt holds Vera's 65-year-old father captive and forces the graphic artist to help make the fake dollar bills. The gang also includes Browski. He is the man who shot the dropout Groß, who also belongs to the gang, on the radio tower. Roberts quickly realizes that Vera didn't tell him the whole truth and confronts her with his findings. Things soon come to a head. A trail leads Roberts to Humboldthafen, where the American is attacked by Martin and Browski and finally knocked out. Eventually he ends up in the water, wakes up in a convalescent home apparently in East Berlin and is questioned by a Soviet interpreter named Tamara on behalf of her superior, the Soviet Major Sirotkin. The Berlin police have now determined that the dollar bills that have appeared in large numbers are counterfeits. As a result, the American occupation forces in Berlin pricked up their ears, and Kriminalrat Wengen joined forces with his US colleague, Kriminaldezernaut Harris. The British also intervene through the crime department head Lonergan.

Gradually, the ring around the criminal gang tightens, the police and the members of the counterfeiting ring deliver fast-paced chases all over West Berlin. Roberts and Vera are now caught between the fronts, and Pratt, hypocritically claiming his love for Vera, has made her his prisoner. The gangsters have set up their workshop at the interface between the west and east sectors, under the ruined Reichstag building, where you least expect them to be. Roberts, with a head injury, shows up to rescue Pratt and Vera's father, Karl Dornbrink, from the villains' hands. Gang leader Pratt drags Vera away, pursued by Roberts. In the meantime, the Berlin police stormed the hiding place to dig it out. This eventually leads to a fight with the gangsters.

Cast
 Gordon Howard as Ronald Roberts / Claude Norbert in the French version
  as Vera Dornbrink
 Kurt Meisel as Gregor Pratt
 Hans Nielsen as Kriminalrat Dr. Wangen
 Wolfgang Neuss as Martin
 Ernst Konstantin as Major Sirotkin
 Barbara Rütting as Tamara, Dolmetscherin
 Paul Bildt as Karl Dornbrink
 Heinz Engelmann as Kommissar Max Lüdecke
 Heinz Giese as Richard Browski
 Herbert Kiper as Kommissar Kretschmer
 Klaus Miedel as Vernon, Interpol-Delegierter
 Werner Schöne
 Rudi Stöhr
 Walter Bechmann
 Walter Tarrach as Werner, Zeuge
 Heinz Oskar Wuttig as Kriminaldezernent Lonergan
 Willi Braunsdorf as Groß, Fälscher
 Ruth Nimbach
 Harro ten Brook as Kriminaldzernent Harris
 Eric Schildkraut
 Joe Furtner
 Rolf Heydel as Kriminalkommissar Bludau
 Josef Kamper as Kröger, Fälscher
 Peter Lehmbrock as Wittels, Fälscher
 Horst Buchholz as Junger Mann am Funkturm
 Günter Pfitzmann as Polizist in Funkzentrale

References

Bibliography
 Baer, Hester. Dismantling the Dream Factory: Gender, German Cinema, and the Postwar Quest for a New Film Language. Berghahn Books, 2012.

External links 
 

1952 films
1950s thriller films
German thriller films
West German films
1950s German-language films
Films directed by František Čáp
Films set in Berlin
Films shot in Berlin
German black-and-white films
Films shot at Spandau Studios
1950s German films